The R349 road, commonly called the Loughrea–Athenry Road, is a regional road in Ireland, located in County Galway.

References

Regional roads in the Republic of Ireland
Roads in County Galway